Table tennis men's singles C8–10 at the 2022 Commonwealth Games is held at the National Exhibition Centre at Birmingham, England from 3 to 6 August 2022.

Finals

Group stage

Group 1

Group 2

References

External links 
 Table Tennis results at Commonwealth Games Birmingham 2022 website – Select Filter by Event - Men's Singles

Men's singles C8-10